Art is an unincorporated community in Perry Township, Clay County, Indiana. It is part of the Terre Haute Metropolitan Statistical Area.

History
A post office was established at Art in 1873, and remained in operation until it was discontinued in 1903. The name Art was selected for its brevity.

Geography

References

Unincorporated communities in Clay County, Indiana
Unincorporated communities in Indiana
Terre Haute metropolitan area
1873 establishments in Indiana
Populated places established in 1873